Orthodox churches in Rostov-on-Don were built during the 17th–20th centuries; they played a decisive role in shaping of the architectural appearance of Rostov-on-Don. They created the high-altitude dominants which were really so important for each city. In addition, all the churches had their own unique style, reflecting the development of Russian art throughout the centuries.

Terminology
Some churches have a special status and referred to as soborny khram (соборный храм) or simply sobor, from the Old Russian word for "gathering" (see “sobor” for other meanings). In Greek, diocesan sees are referred to as καθεδρικός ναός. In Russian, a cathedral is a "sobor" (Russian: кафедральный собор, kafedralny sobor). The seat of the Patriarch is called a "patriarchal sobor" (Патриарший собор, Patriarchiye sobor) The main church of a monastery may also called a "sobor". If a bishop builds a new sobor for his cathedra, the old church retains its status of a sobor. The status of sobor may be assigned only by the Patriarch.

A church independent of local eparchy is called "stauropegial sobor" (Greek stauropegia means "mounting of the cross"). For example, patriarchal sobors are stauropigial ones.

Architecture
Orthodox church buildings have the following basic shapes, each with its own symbolism:

 Elongated: rectangle, rounded rectangle (oval), symbolizing the ship as a means of salvation (Noah's Ark)
 Cruciform (cross shaped)
 Star shaped
 Circular

The cupola instead of a flat ceiling symbolizes the sky.
The altar (sanctuary) is situated in the eastern part of the church, regardless of its shape. A bell tower is attached to (or built separately by) the western part of the church.

The church building has many symbolic meanings; perhaps the oldest and most prominent is the concept that the Church is the Ark of Salvation (as in Noah's Ark) in which the world is saved from the flood of temptations. Because of this, most Orthodox Churches are rectangular in design. Another popular shape, especially for churches with large choirs is cruciform or cross-shaped.

The Church building is divided into three main parts: the narthex (vestibule), the nave (the temple proper) and the sanctuary (also called the altar or holy place).

A major difference of traditional Orthodox churches from Western churches is absence any pews in the nave. Traditionally there is no sitting during services with the only exceptions being during the reading of the Psalms, and the priest's sermon. The people stand before God.

Churches in Rostov-on-Don
Churches in Rostov-on-Don play an important role in the religious sphere of the life of the city and are of interest not only for Orthodox residents, but also for tourists who want to become acquainted with its history and architecture. There are many churches in Rostov-on-Don, including both Orthodox and those of other religions. The history is very rich, but not all the churches have survived to this day.

One of them is The church of St. Michael the Archangel (the Church of the Red Cross). It was built in Rostov-on-Don in 1894 in the image and likeness of the church -monument in Borki. It situated on the territory of the Mykolayiv city hospital. In the Soviet era the church was closed and by the beginning of the 1960s completely demolished.

Alexander Nevsky Cathedral(Russian: Александро-Невский собор (Ростов-на-Дону)) – another destroyed cathedral of Rostov-on-Don in 1930. The cathedral was situated on Novaya Bazarnaya Square, at the intersection of Bolshaya Sadovaya Street and Bolshoy Stolypinsky Prospect (now Voroshilovsky Prospekt). Before its destruction the cathedral was the largest religious building and the tallest building in the city.

Cathedral Church of Nativity of the Blessed Virgin
Basic information

Cathedral of the Nativity of the Blessed Virgin Mary (Russian: Собор Рождества Пресвятой Богородицы (Ростов-на-Дону)) ― a cathedral of the Diocese of Rostov and Novocherkassk.

At the end of the 18th century the city authorities decided to build a temple dedicated to the Navity of the Blessed Virgin Mary. It was meant to be constructed in the same suburb, near the present-day Central market. The church was founded on February 20, 1781, and opened on September 5, 1781. Both the beginning of construction works and opening of the church were consecrated by Archpriest Ioann Andreev. However, only ten years after, on December 27, 1791, a lightning strike burned the temple.

In 1795 at the same place began the construction works of the Church of the Nativity of the Blessed Virgin. In 1822 the church received cathedral status on decree of the Holy Synod.

Due to rapid population growth in Rostov, in 1854 Emperor Nicholas I approved the draft of a new stone church instead of old stone one with wooden domes, which came into dilapidated state. The cathedral was built in the period from 1854 to 1860 on the standard design made by architect Konstantin Ton. Because of that, the cathedral outside looks similar to other temples that were based on his projects (Cathedral of Christ the Saviour in Moscow).

The main building was a trustee of the church warden Konstantin Mikhailov-Nefedov. On the funds of honorary citizen of Rostov Igor Panchenko there were painted walls, bought icons, made church fence and planted crosses on the domes.

In 1937 the cathedral was closed, and on its territory was opened a zoo, and the cathedral itself was used as warehouse. In the 1940s the upper tiers of the bell tower were destroyed.

The cathedral was opened again in 1942, when Rostov was occupied by German army. In 1950 the cathedral was redecorated and the old paintings were restored. In 1988 the interior redecoration was also done.

In 1999, on the 250th anniversary of the city of Rostov, the bell tower was restored in its original form.

Martyr Tsarina Alexandra Church
Basic information
	

Martyr Tsarina Alexandra Church (Russian: Церковь Святой Александры (Ростов-на-Дону)). In the 19th century in the city of Nakhchivan-on-Don, on this place the first wooden cemetery chapel for a burial service of orthodox inhabitants has been erected. Then, in 1904, instead of a chapel has been constructed stone church on the project of the architect V. V. Popov which has remained up to now. In 50th and 70th last century the church was partially reconstructed. New revival of Martyr Tsarina Alexandra Church (the Alexandria temple) in Rostov-on-Don has happened in the 90th years. Today it is a monument of the Russian Orthodox temple architecture of Don of the end of XIX – the beginnings of the 20th centuries and costs on the state protection.

This small, cozy building painted in blue tone with a tent belfry and an extended antechurch, has original architecture. In a northern part of the temple building the Throne for the sake of the prince Alexander Nevsky is attached. To the left of an entrance to the Alexandria temple in Rostov-on-Don the memorable plate about the lost Alexander Nevsky Church built in the 19th century in honor of the 650 anniversary of a victory of the prince Alexander over Swedes on coast of Neva is attached.

The Alexandria temple in Rostov-on-Don is considered the successor of two monumental and esteemed by ancestors churches of Nakhchivan – Sofiyskaya and Alexandria. Whether by tradition or in a tribute to the memory some parishioners continue to call church of the queen Aleksandra Sofiyskaya. The church on Kayani introduces kind power to each believer therefore it is visited by pilgrims from all Rostov.

Christ Ascension Church
Basic information 

Church of the Ascension of the Lord (Christ Ascension Church) (Russian: Храм Вознесения Господня (Ростов-на-Дону)) ― an Orthodox church, built in 1910–1913 on the territory of Brethren Cemetery in Rostov-on-Don. The church has the status of an object of cultural heritage of regional significance.

In 1892, after a cholera epidemic outbreak outside the city, there had been established a cemetery, which was named Brethren Cemetery (Братское). From 1891 to 1908 at the New Market Square there had been being built the Alexander Nevsky's Cathedral. After the consecration of the cathedral, it was decided not to demolish the church completely, but to disassemble and transport building material to the Brethren Cemetery for the construction of a new church there.

Transportation was implemented at the expense of merchants Gerasimov, Myasnikov and Safonov. Construction works were carried out under the direction of the city architect G.N. Vasilyev.

In 1929 the church was closed. "Dinamo" sport stadium used its premises as a warehouse. In 1933, after an appeal to the authorities of the Assumption community in the church was opened again, only to be re-closed again in 1937. In 1930-1940s bell tower and dome of the temple were destroyed. In 1942, during the times of German occupation, the church was re-opened. The official opening of the church took place in 1946, and since then the services have not stopped.

In the late 1990s, restoration works were conducted, during which the bell tower and the dome were restored. In the second half of the 2000s there was carried out reconstruction of church interior.

The Greek Annunciation Church (The Church of the Annunciation of the Blessed Virgin)
Basic information 

The Greek Annunciation Church(Russian: Храм Благовещения Пресвятой Богородицы, Благовещенская греческая церковь (Ростов-на-Дону)) was constructed in Rostov-on-Don at the beginning of the 20th century. The temple was located in Tkachyovsky Lane (nowadays Universitetsky) at its crossing with Malo-Sadovaya Street (nowadays Suvorov Street) in the territory belonging to "The Hellenic benevolent society". Funds for construction of the temple endowed the Greeks living in the city. The most considerable donation was made by the owner of tobacco factory Achilles Aslanidi. The temple was put in 1907, and in 1909 the construction was complete.

The temple was built in a style of neoclassicism. It is 19×10 sazhens (40,5×21 m). Over the main entrance with a four-columned portico was towered the twenty-meter two-story bell-tower. At the temple the library with books operated on Greek.

In the 1930th years the temple was closed and adapted for the children's technical station. During the German occupation of Rostov the temple was reopened. On November 6, 1942 near the Annunciation Church took place the review parade of the Romanian troops devoted to birthday of the Romanian king Mihai I. In this action participated German officers. The parade came to the end with a solemn church service in Annunciation Church.

In 1959 the temple was finally closed. The building was transferred to the next school No. 7. In the former church was placed the gym and industrial practice workshops. In 1964 in this building was situated the Puppet theater (Universitetsky Lane, 46). The building of the temple was saved, but thanks to extensions the appearance changed to unrecognizability.

After reorganization in Rostov-on-Don began to be discussed the question of possible restoration of Annunciation Church and transfer of Puppet theater to another place. However this idea did not find big support, and then was decided to build a new temple nearby. In 2003 for construction of the temple was allocated the land plot near the Don public library. The temple was decided to built in the neobyzantine style. The architect G. A. Shevchenko became the author of the project of the temple.

The solemn laying of the building of the temple took place on September 22, 2007. In 2012 near the temple under construction there was a small temporary church in which will be held church services before the end of construction.
 
In museum of local lore of the Rostov region remained the mortgage board of the first temple with an inscription that in August 1907 was put "the stone for the sake of Annunciation Church". This mortgage board is planned to be transferred to the new temple after opening.

The Orthodox religious organization Holy Iversky diocesan convent of the Religious organization "Rostov — on — Don Eparkhiya of Russian Orthodox Church (the Moscow Patriarchy)"
Basic information

The Holy Iversky Convent (Russian: Иверский женский монастырь (Ростов-на-Дону)).

History of the Holy Iversky Convent began in 1903 when according to the application of nuns of the Black Sea monastery Ekaterina and Aleksandra the Rostov Justice allocated the site in two tithes of the earth in 20 versts from Rostov for construction of women's monastery. The trustee of the monastery became the merchant S. I. Fedorov therefore the monastery received the name "Fedorovsky". The legend remained that the merchant built the monastery for the sixteen-year-old daughter who wished to move away from the world. In several years on the monastery earth appeared on the wooden chapel and cells which subsequently replaced into stone. Over a curative source was built kaplitsa, nearby – the Mother Superior's lodge. The monastic garden was laid out and a pond was dig out.
 
In 1095 by the request of S. I. Fedorov the famous architect N. M. Sokolov executed the project of the small stone monastery temple. The construction came to the end in 1908. The temple was consecrated in honor of the Iverian Theotokos which list was presented to the monastery by his benefactor merchant Fedorov.

In the years of World War I in the monastery situated the shelter for the orphan girls which were brought to Rostov from the occupied Poland. They lived here and studied prior to the beginning of the 1920th years.

After the October revolution hung the threat of closing of monastery. The Mother Superior Anastasia found the wise solution to register a community as agricultural artel that allowed to keep monastic life in the years of persecutions from the godless power.

Everything broke in 1929. The monastery was closed, the property was transferred to the possession by the states, novices and nuns were expelled, and prosecuted the seventy-year-old Mother Superior with several sisters were sent to Siberia.
 
After closing of the monastery in the building of the temple placed club of state farm, in the private case – at first orphanage, then workshops, then warehouses.

The fine monastic garden was cut down, the apiary died, kaplitsa was sorted on a stone. The pond turned into the swamp, the sacred source was dirtied. On everything reigned the abomination of desolation.

Only more than half a century later began a revival of Holy Iversky monastery. In the period of an archflamenship on the Don earth of the Metropolitan of Kiev in the 1991 in Rostov diocese was founded Holy Iversky Convent. From June 1993 to August 1996 the nun Neonila was a mother superior (Sergienko Nina Sergeyevna, is released for health reasons). The top temple in honor of the Iverian Theotokos and a bell-tower were restored during this time. In 1996 the nun Rakhil (Kovalyova) is appointed the Mother Superior of the monastery.

Now in the monastery there are more than 30 nuns. They daily make church services in the monastery temple, work on a kitchen garden, in subsidiary farm, in the prosfoyena, and bear others monastic obedience.

The Holy Trinity Church
Basic information

The history of the Holy Trinity church originates since February 28, 1994.

Holy Trinity church (Russian: Церковь Святой Троицы).
On the place of future arrival there was a waste ground on which there was a garbage dump. At the request of locals the Metropolitan of Rostov and Novocherkassk Vladimir (Kotlyarov) caused on February 28 for a conversation of the prior of the temple great martyr Georges the Victorious of the village Masked Matveevo-Kurgansky deanery of the priest Ioann Osyak and appointed him in combination the prior of a community which needed to be organized in arrival, and further build the temple and other necessary structures.

In 1995 the earth on which the Holy Trinity complex is located now was leased to arrival for 49 years. The territory was cleared, all garbage which was in the territory was taken out.

The metropolitan Vladimir (Kotlyarov) dismisses the priest Ioann Osyak of the prior of the temple in the village Masked and appoints him in combination the prior of arrival of the Reverend Seraphim of Sarov who was completely destroyed and needed restoration.
 
The Board of trustees of two arrivals was created which in the city of Rostov-on-Don will be organized for the first time. Prominent businessmen and public figures of the city, such as Shevchenko Nikolay Vasilyevich, Mukovoz Yury Ivanovich, Kochkanyan Armenak Todosovich, Gayduk Sergey Valentinovich and others enter it.

Construction of office buildings begins: witness marks and Sunday school, and also was developed the project of the temple in honor of the Reverend Sergey of Radonezh.

Construction of the temple in honor of the Reverend Sergey of Radonezh begins fall in 1996, and in a year it was consecrated.

In 2000 the list of Church of St. Sergius of Radonezh came to the end.

In 2001 begins the construction of the main temple for the sake of the Holy Trinity.
 
In 2002 the zero cycle of the temple was constructed, and since 2003 began in the temple regular church services.

In 2004 at the expense of the Board of trustees were established 8 bells on temple belfries. At the beginning of November 2004 the ruling bishop consecrated five domes of the temple which were established on the central drum and four belltowers of the Troitsk temple.

Since November 22, 2004 the ruling bishop appoints the archpriest Ioann Osyak the head of the press center Rostov – on – Don dioceses. He was entrusted to found television station. Active work on arrangement and equipment of diocesan television station began in the first floor of the temple. In the middle of February 2005 the television station was consecrated and began the broadcasting on three television channels of the city of Rostov-on-Don and its area. Now the number of channels increased to 10, covering all Rostov region.

For a holiday of the Holy Trinity of 2005 took place the first prestolny service at which there were a great number of residents of Rostov-on-Don and area.

Since 2009 the list of walls of the Troitsk temple which proceeds and now begins. In 2013 gilding of an iconostasis was finished.

The clergy of the temple nurtures pupils of a children's shelter "Nadezhda's House". For the boys and little girls deprived of care from parents in days of Great church holidays is prepared morning performances, gifts are given. More than eight years arrival closely cooperates with ROOO "Rostov without Drugs". In the territory of arrival works the counseling center of this organization. The archpriest Ioann Osyak is a confessor of ROOO "Rostov without Drugs", with its direct participation was created two men's and women's centers of rehabilitation in which during this time more than 1200 people successfully underwent rehabilitation.

Church of the Intercession of the Holy Virgin
Basic information

Church of the Intercession of the Holy Virgin (Russian: Церковь во имя Покрова Пресвятой Богородицы, Покровская церковь (Ростов-на-Дону)) ― one of the oldest churches in Rostov-on-Don (there is a common misconception that it was the first church in the city). The original building was situated approximately at the corner of Bolshaya Sadovaya street. Over time, it has somewhat shifted towards Bogatyanovsky Lane (now ― Kirov Avenue).

In 1762, after the demolition of St. Anne fortress, located near Cherkassk (nowadays ― Starocherkasskaya village) on Vasilyevsky hills, it was decided to transport the Holy Protection Church located therein to the newly built St. Dimitry of Rostov Fortress. The church was dismantled, all logs were numbered and transported to the chosen place.

Over time, there had been grown a need for a bigger church. The old church building was dismantled and almost at the same place a new building (also wooden) was constructed. The consecration of the church took place on September 28, 1784.

In 1818 in bell tower were installed clocks.

For a considerable period of time Intercession Church served as the principal church not only for the fortress of St. Dimitry of Rostov, but also for people of local settlements. Since the end of the 18th century Church of Intercession had been considered to be a cathedral. The status changed in 1822, when Church of the Nativity of the Blessed Virgin Mary on the decree of the Holy Synod was declared cathedral.

On November 2, 1895 due to the negligence of the caretaker there was a fire, which has burned down the bell tower and damaged the building of the church itself.

On August 10, 1897 a new stone building was constructed on the project of architect Nikolay Sokolov.
 
In 1930 the church was demolished. In the following years a fountain was constructed on its place. Later there was also established a public garden and constructed a Monument to Sergey Kirov (it is said that for construction of this monument there were used marble slabs left from the church).

In the post-soviet times, there were talks about the restoration of the church. On February 3, 2005, at the Kirov public garden was installed and consecrated a memorial cross and was laid the first symbolic stone in the foundation of the new church. Construction of the temple was funded by donations from all over Russia. The church, built on the project of architect G. Shevchenko, received the name of Old-Intercession (Старо-Покровская) and was consecrated on November 11, 2007 by the Archbishop of Rostov and Novocherkassk Panteleimon.

Church of the Kazan Icon of Madonna
Basic information 

The Church of the Kazan Icon of the Mother of God (Russian: Храм Казанской иконы Божьей Матери, Казанская церковь (Ростов-на-Дону)) is an orthodox church of Rostov and Novocherkassk diocese Northern deanery of the Moscow Patriarchate.

The Church of the Kazan Icon of the Mother of God was built in Rostov-on-Don near the Northern Reservoir (Russian: Северное Водохранилище). This territory belonged to the Armenian monastery Sourb-Khach (Russian: Сурб-Хач) earlier. In 1996 citizens decided to build this church, because the area lacked orthodox churches. There would be a Holy Kazakh Temple which was destroyed 1931.

Initially, people constructed a so-called meeting house, and in 2004 they began to deal with the construction of a stone church. It took 3.5 years to complete and decorate it. On November 9, 2008 the Rostov and Novocherkassk archbishop Panteleimon (Dolganov) consecrated the church.
Nowadays it is a modern building with heating. The temple is made of brick and has golden domes, the belfry includes 9 bells. Services are held every day, and the church organizes charity dinners as well. Dmitry Sobolevsky is the abbot of the temple.

There are a Sunday School, courses in spiritual studies, pilgrimage trips, all these activities have something to do with the church.

Church of Holy Hierarch Dimitry, Rostov Metropolitan
Basic information 

Church of Holy Hierarch Dimitry, Rostov Metropolitan (Russian: Церковь Димитрия Ростовского (Ростов-на-Дону)).

In the middle of the 18th century, according to the royal decree, for the protection of the fortress and also for spiritual protection of the southern boundaries of the Russian Empire, the prelate Dimitry of Rostov has been prayerfully called new glorified sacred Russian Orthodox Church. With protection of this great educator of Russia, fortress has quickly enough turned into the city which was called St. Dimitry of Rostov's city, early – Dimitriyevsk. To this day inhabitants of "gate of the North Caucasus" revere memory of the Heavenly Patron – the prelate Dimitry of Rostov, on October 4 and on November 10.

On October 4, 1999, in day of his memory, the Archbishop Rostov and Novocherkassk (nowadays Yaroslavl and Rostov) Panteleimon has put the first stone in foundation of future temple, the worthy Heavenly Patron of Rostov-on-Don, on September 15, 2001, in anniversary year of the 350 anniversary since the birth of the prelate Dimitry of Rostov, the Religious Procession during which to the temporary temple became the main event of the City Day (the first Church service has taken place on July 12, 1997.) particles of sacred relics of the prelate Dimitrii and the rights of the soldier Feodor Ushakov, the admiral of the Russian fleet (all in the temple particles of relics of 22 Orthodox Christians of Saints, and also the honored lists of wonder-working icons of Blessed Virgin Mary stay)  have been delivered.

On September 15, 2005 it became the opening day of the Archbishop Panteleimon has made a thanksgiving.

Church of the Great Martyr Saint George the Victorious
Basic information

Church of St. George the Victorious – (Russian: Церковь Георгия Победоносца (Ростов-на-Дону)) belongs to Rostov and Novocherkassk  Diocese of Moscow Patriarchate.

The St. George parish was established in 1993. One-story church was established in 1994 in the residential district of the Soviet district.
The first Divine service in the church was performed in 1994 in memory of St. George the Victorious. The building of the church was reconstructed.

In 2003, the construction of a capital annex to the old church building began. By 2007 his decoration continued – the altar and the vaults of the church were painted with canonical images in the Old Russian style.

The Church of St. John of Kronstadt
Basic information

Church of St. John of Kronstadt, Rostov-on-Don (Russian: Церковь Иоанна Кронштадтского (Ростов-на-Дону)) belongs to Rostov and Novocherkassk  Diocese of Moscow Patriarchate. It was built in 2010 on the project of architect Genrikh Vasilyevich Ivanov.

The church dedicated to Saint John of Kronstadt is the only church of the Rostov and Novorcherkassk Diocese that was built specially for university students.

The history of this temple began in 1992. On September 29 took place the opening of a chapel at the Rostov State Transport University. The first prayer service in the chapel was hell on September 1, 1993.

The following year, on July 12, Archbishop of Rostov and Novocherkassk Panteleimon consecrated construction site, and on July 26 construction of the church began. The first Divine Liturgy was held there on June 3, 1994. Soon it was decided to dedicate the new church in honor of St. John of Kronstadt. In 1999 Patriarch of Moscow Alexy II attended the University and consecrated the area of People's Militia's Square and the foundation stone at the construction site.

Reverend Seraphim Sarovsky Church
Basic information

	

The Church of St. Seraphim Sarovsky (Russian: Храм Преподобного Серафима Саровского (Ростов-на-Дону)) is an orthodox church in Rostov-on-Don. It was built in Gnilovskaya village between 1904 and 1911 upon the project of the architect B.A. Raychenkov.

The history of the construction of the church dates back to the 19th century. The orthodox citizens of Gnilovskaya village started to erect a temple in honour of St. Seraphim Sarovsky who greatly influenced Russian people. In 1911 the process of construction was ended thanks to the voluntary donations of parishioners. On December 4, 1911 the rural dean Alexander Grigoriev consecrated the church in the name of St. Seraphim Sarovsky.

In 1937 the church was closed, but in 1942 the services started to be held again until 1956. In 1956–1960 the building was reconstructed, but now it was a musical school named after M.I. Glinka. In January 1995 the Rostov and Novocherkassk bishop Panteleimon began to control the reconstruction of the church. Finally, on September 14, 2004 he consecrated the newly built church of St. Seraphim Sarovsky.

Christ Resurrection (Mid-Pentecost) Church
Basic information

The Slavic Pentecostal Church (Russian: Храм Преполовения Пятидесятницы (Ростов-на-Дону))- an orthodox church, is considered to be one of the most significant temples in Rostov-on-Don.

The temple dates from 1824 to 1829, and was built in the Cossack village named Nizhne-Gnilovskaya. It took five years to build the church. On the morrow of the construction, in 1829 it was consecrated in honour of the Resurrection of Christ. Although at the request of parishioners, the Pentecost was decided to be the patronal feast of the church. That is why the temple has such a name. In 1980 the single-domed church had a belfry, and there were a lodge and a chancery near it. The clergy included a priest and a psalmist who lived on alms.

In the 19th century the epidemic of cholera spread across the city, which resulted in numerous deaths. The Aksay Icon of the Mother of God – Odigitria – was considered a miraculous icon which confronted the epidemic. In 1892–1893 people built a chapel in the name of Chudotvornaya Aksay Icon of Odigitria, which was a kind of salvation and a true miracle which prevented from the horrible cholera and saved lives of folks.

In 1908–1909 new sacrariums with thrones were created. The north sacrarium, built on October 27, 1909, was consecrated in honour of the St. Alexis, the Metropolitan of Kiev. The south sacrarium was built on October 7, 1910 in the name of the Icon of the Mother of God. A high belfry was constructed there, and moreover, the interior underwent changes: the church was decorated with paintings of saints. In 1898 a parish school was opened. Now clergy included 2 priests, 2 psalmists and a deacon.

During the Civil War, the members of the White movement were focused on the church, which became the centre of the White Army later on. There was an attempt to organize a rebuff to the spreading of Soviet Power. In 1918 the priest of the church, Alexei Chasovnickov, asked a group of Cossacks to gather around for discussing some important issues. They decided to resist the Red Army, the squad of Rudolf Sivers, who had to abandon Rostov, as the White Army, which was under the command of Lavr Kornilov, turned out to be larger. 
  
In 1940 the church was destroyed, and in 17 years the citizens started to build a cinema named “Mir” (Russian: «Мир»). Although in 1991 everything was changed, and the Cossacks demanded to close it and to build a temple, and the first rector of the church was Alexiy. In 1996 the church was reconstructed upon the project of the architect Y.N. Solnyshkin.

Church of Great Martyr and Healer Saint Panteleymon
Basic information

Church of Great Martyr and Healer Saint Panteleymon (Russian: Храм Святого Великомученика и целителя Пантелеймона).
The church is arranged at the initiative of the organization of liquidators of the Chernobyl accident "the Union Chernobyl" and the orthodox center "Blagovest" in the tenth anniversary of the Chernobyl accident and consecrated in day of remembrance of the Saint great martyr on August 9, 1996. The building for the temple was reconstructed on the project of the architect A. Buchkin. From now the temple is equipping and reconstructing continuously with modern conveniences, taking appearance of a standard cult construction. There are hold the orthodox spiritual and educational center "Blagovest" and Sunday school works.

The Church of all Saints
Basic information

	
The Church of all Saints (Russian: Храм Всех Святых, в земле Российской просиявших).
In 1995 the Archbishop Rostov and Novocherkassk Panteleimon has signed the Decree on creation of orthodox parish to the settlement Chkalovsky of Rostov-on-Don. Arrival at that time had no building for commission of church services yet and has legally been written down to the address of the house of one of organizers of an orthodox community in Chkalovsk the settlement.

Parishioners of the temple and Cossacks of the village with assistance of the Lord have appealed to administration to lease to arrival the building of the former movie theater "Chkalovets" — on December 12, 1999 in the temple have served the first prayer. On February 14, 2000 there was an official resolution of the mayor on transfer to rent to orthodox parish to honor of All Saints, in the Russian land who have lit up of the building of the former movie theater.
   
The building is completely plastered, the project of gasification of the building of the temple is made and approved, capital repairs of economic rooms are executed.

In 2008 the big dome is established, in East side the extension in the form of an altar apse is attached, metalplastic windows are inserted, the iconostasis framework is mounted, heat-insulated floors are made, gasification of the temple is complete.

In 2009 the building facade is painted, the roof is replaced, the temple building is repaired, the keramo-granite tile is laid.

Now the temple actively is engaged social, educational, educational and publishing.

The temple of Saint John the Warrior
Basic information

The temple of Saint John the Warrior(Russian: Храм Иоанна Воина) is a part of a spiritual and patriotic complex under construction for the sake of the great martyr Georges the Victorious. The idea of a complex belonged to the Archbishop Rostov and Novocherkassk Panteleymon and the Russian President's Plenipotentiary in the South federal district V. G. Kazantsev. 
 
On April 6, 2002 the project has received blessing of the Most Saint patriarch of Moscow and all Russia Alexy II with the resolution: "The Lord will bless this good undertaking and the God's help accompanies the maker".

On May 6, 2002 lord Panteleymon has consecrated a foundation stone, and exactly in a year there was a consecration of already erected temple of the martyr John the Warrior on the same day. Our temple is built in the best traditions of the Russian architecture. The view of the temple is developed by the Kirov firm "Okimo". 
  
It is the first in the contemporary history wooden temple in Rostov-on-Don. The project of an iconostasis belongs to the Rostov icon painter Vladimir Makarov. The temple rather small, but, besides the room for church services, under his arches there are a belltower, a refectory and the lecture hall.
 
Active participation in construction of the temple of John the Warrior and his today's life is accepted by Ivan Ignatyevich Savvidi.

Temple of the Mother of God of Tenderness
Basic information

Temple of the Mother of God of Tenderness (Russian: Храм в честь Иконы Божией Матери "Умиление").

The Orthodox prayer house was opened in Pervomaisk (former Stalin) area of Rostov-on-Don, during the Great Patriotic War, in honor of the icon of the Mother of God "Odigitria." In 1964, the executive local government decided to liquidate the parish. In 90-s, with the beginning of the revival of Orthodoxy in Russia, according to the numerous requests of the inhabitants, the leadership of Rostov-on-Don decided to restore the destroyed shrine. A piece of land for the construction of the new church was allotted  in Sergo Ordzhonikidze Square. March 28, 1997 became the date of the official formation of the new Orthodox parish in honor of the icon of the Mother of God "Tenderness". The name of the church was adopted at the First Congregation MeetingWorship services were held in the rented premises of the production hall,  and located nearby in the park during the construction of the church. The first stone for the construction of a new church was laid on March 25, 1998, with the blessing of Vladyka Panteleimon, On March 23, 2004, golden domes shone above the temple. On August 10, 2005, the first divine services began to be performed. On August 3, 2008, the great consecration of the new church in the name of the icon of the Mother of God "Tenderness" was held by the Archbishop of Rostov and Novocherkassk.

Temple in honor of the icon of the Blessed Virgin Mary "Healer"
Basic information

Temple in honor of the icon of the Blessed Virgin Mary "Healer" (Russian: Храм в честь иконы Пресвятой Богородицы "Целительница" ).

The parish of the Russian Orthodox Church in Voenved area was founded in 1996 – at the height of the first Chechen war. Dozens of killed servicemen and wounded daily arrived in the district military clinical hospital. The head of the hospital decided to open a chapel for the burial service of the dead and something like a temple where the wounded soldiers could pray on the territory of the medical institution. ...Approximately at the same time the administration of the Oktyabrsky district allocated a plot of land for construction of the church opposite the military market.
The leadership of the North Caucasian Railway donated a railway carriage that was converted to a temple and on August 9, 1997 the first Liturgy was served.

The design and survey work was delayed due to the abundance of underground communications, which could not be avoided when laying a temple. The 600 mm sewage collector was especially disturbing. To determine the place helped ... a small icon of the Blessed Virgin "Healer". Once the first rector of the church, father Vadim Tsarev, witnessed a real miracle: the picture of the mountain appeared directly in the air under the icon, the image appeared voluminous and clear, as under modern holography.

In November 2001, the first pile of the foundation of the Temple was built in honor of the icon of the Blessed Virgin Mary "Healer".

In 2002, the casting of a monolithic slab was completed and the construction of a three-meter zero cycle of the temple was started.
May 19, 2006 the church was decorated with the first dome.

On April 8, 2007, the first service in the vestibule of the church under construction took place on the Bright Resurrection of Christ.

On March 21, 2010, on the Feast of the Exaltation of the Holy Cross and the Life-Creating Cross, was made the transition to the main part of the church.
 
On September 14, 2010, the archbishop of Rostov Panteleimon was illuminated with bells, and on September 28 of the same year they were raised to the bell tower.

On April 25, 2012, Archpriest Constantine Makarenko was appointed as the rector of the church.

June 25, 2012 Archpriest Vadim Tsarev died after a serious illness.

There are 3 clergymen in the temple staff at the present time.

June 20, 2015 by the decree of the Head of the Don Metropolitanate, Metropolitan of Rostov and Novocherkassk Mercury, Archpriest Constantine Makarenko, rector of the church, was appointed as a dean of the North-Western District of Rostov-on-Don.

References

External links
 http://iamruss.ru/orthodox-church-internal-structure/
 http://www.mytravelnotes.ru/2014/09/aleksandro-nevskij-sobor-rostov.html
 http://sobory.ru/article/?object=33976
 http://www.ruist.ru/index.php/rostovskaya-obl/89-ob2/1450
 http://www.rostovgid.ru/mesta/aleksandriyskiy-hram-6117.htm
 http://www.rostoveparhia.ru/eparkhija-segodnja/blagochinija-i-prikhody/tsentralnoe-blagochinie/prikhody-blagochinija/voznesenskii-prihod-g-rostov-na-donu-/Istorija-prihoda/
 http://www.donland.ru/Default.aspx?pageid=78770
 http://www.hram-voznesenie.com/
 http://rostov.4geo.ru/3d/main/index/438270306
 http://staropokrovsky.cbrostov.ru/ 
 http://www.donvrem.dspl.ru/Files/article/m8/2/art.aspx?art_id=858
 http://rostov.ru/pokrovsky.html
 http://www.voopiik-don.ru/main/2009-06-01-10-23-39/39-2009-06-01-07-01-14/49-2009-06-01-07-47-19
 http://sobor.rostoveparhia.ru/
 http://fb.ru/article/216395/sobor-rojdestva-presvyatoy-bogoroditsyi-rostov-na-donu-opisanie-istoriya
 http://sobory.ru/article/?object=13889
 http://www.donvrem.dspl.ru/Files/article/m8/2/art.aspx?art_id=633
 http://hramioanna.cerkov.ru/raspisanie-bogosluzhenij/
 http://www.relga.ru/Environ/WebObjects/tgu-www.woa/wa/Main?level1=main&level2=articles&textid=2545
 http://hram2.ucoz.ru/news/svjatitelja_dimitrija_rostovskogo_g_rostov_na_donu/2016-04-29-206
 http://drevo-info.ru/articles/16385.html
 http://blagovest.donpac.ru/
 https://itreba.org/ru/object/hram-panteleimona-rostov-na-donu-2561
 http://palomniki.su/countries/ru/g18/rostov-on-don/cerkov-sv-panteleimona.htm
 http://www.sgprihod.ru/
 http://www.donvrem.dspl.ru/Files/article/m8/2/art.aspx?art_id=633
 http://sobory.ru/article/?object=02621
 https://web.archive.org/web/20170110020832/http://donpravtv.ru/index.php/society-and-church/confessioncanon/730-cutting-off-pentecost-consecr-191211
 http://rslovar.com/content
 http://rostov-50.cerkov.ru/
 http://www.openarium.ru/
 http://www.shukach.com/ru/node/51918
 http://sobory.ru/article/?object=13868
 https://web.archive.org/web/20170914220608/http://kazanskoi.ru/node/443
 http://kazanskoi.ru/Kazanskij%20Hram%20Kosmonavtov%20Komarova.html
 http://serafim-rostov.cerkov.ru/istoriya-xrama-2/
 http://psgp.ru/
 http://putevodnik.ru/48120
 http://hram-ioanna-voina-v-rostove-na-donu-1.keer.su/
 https://vk.com/vseh.svyatih.hram
 http://palomniki.su/countries/ru/g18/rostov-on-don/22024.htm
 https://itreba.org/ru/object/hram-vsekh-svyatyh-rostov-na-donu-2359/prior
 http://hram-umilenie.ru
 http://voenved-hram.info

Eastern Orthodox church buildings in Russia
Churches in Rostov-on-Don